This is about the hospital, for the mental hospital see Somerville Asylum.

The CHA Somerville Campus is an outpatient medical center at 33 Tower Street in Somerville, Massachusetts - near Porter Square and Davis Square.

It is operated by Cambridge Health Alliance.

Services

The main CHA Somerville Campus has a wide variety of health services, including:

 Center of Inpatient Child & Adolescent Psychiatry
 CHA Urgent Care
 CHA Somerville Pediatrics
 Somerville OB/GYN Center
 Radiology and Imaging
 GI Center
 Eye Center
 Medical and Surgery Specialty clinics

Service highlights
 Child & Adolescent Psychiatry
 Urgent Care
National Accreditation:

 CT Service, American College of Radiology
 Ultrasound Service, American College of Radiology
 Breast Imaging Center of Excellence, American College of Radiology

Academics
Cambridge Health Alliance is a teaching affiliate of Harvard Medical School, Harvard School of Public Health, Harvard School of Dental Medicine, and the Tufts University School of Medicine.

CHA Primary Care, which is based at the hospital, is a main teaching location for the CHA Internal Medicine Residency Program.

History
The hospital was first incorporated in 1891, and the first buildings were erected the following year. In 2009, the inpatient hospital beds were closed, but the emergency department remained open as a satellite emergency facility. In April 2020, the emergency department was converted to an Urgent Care Center.

In 2016, a Somerville woman named Laura Levis collapsed outside Somerville Hospital while unable to find an unlocked door to the emergency room during a severe asthma attack. Her death led to the passage of a Massachusetts law, nicknamed "Laura's Law," to ensure clear and safe access to hospital emergency departments for pedestrians.

References

External links
 Cambridge Health Alliance website

Harvard Medical School
Hospitals established in 1891
Buildings and structures in Somerville, Massachusetts